Andrew Flower  (born 28 April 1968) is a Zimbabwean cricket coach and a former cricketer. As a cricketer, he captained the Zimbabwe national cricket team and is widely regarded as one of the greatest wicket-keeper-batters of all time. He was Zimbabwe's wicket-keeper for more than 10 years and is, statistically, the greatest batsman the country has produced. During his peak from October to December 2001, Flower was ranked as the best Test batsman in the world. He was widely acknowledged as the only Zimbabwe batsman of proper test quality in any conditions. After retirement, he served as the coach of the English cricket team from 2009 to 2014. Flower became the second foreign coach in the team's history. Currently, he is the head coach of Multan Sultans in the Pakistan Super League, St Lucia Kings in the Caribbean Premier League and the Lucknow Super Giants in Indian Premier League. 

Under his tenure, Flower led the Multan Sultans to their first-ever playoffs in the 2020 season. The Sultans finished first in the league stage but ultimately lost in the preliminaries. Similarly, he led the Zouks to their first-ever finals appearance in the CPL. Flower served as assistant coach to Kings XI Punjab(now Punjab Kings) for IPL 2020 and 2021 before joining Lucknow Super Giants as the head coach. In June 2021, he was inducted to the ICC Cricket Hall of Fame and became the first ever Zimbabwean to be inducted into ICC Hall of Fame.

Playing career
Flower was born in Cape Town, South Africa, and starting from his high school days at Oriel Boys' High School and Vainona High School played most of his career alongside his younger brother Grant Flower. He is considered to be one of the best wicket-keeper batsmen of all time, alongside players such as Adam Gilchrist, Kumar Sangakkara and Jeff Dujon. Flower made his international debut in a One Day International against Sri Lanka at New Plymouth, New Zealand, in the 1992 Cricket World Cup. A good player of spin, he made 550 runs in a Test series against India in 2000/01. This tally came in just four innings and he was only dismissed twice. He is one of the few players to score a century on ODI debut and became the first player ever to score a century on ODI debut in a World Cup match.

Flower played 63 Test matches for Zimbabwe, scoring 4,794 runs at an average of 51.54 and taking 151 catches and 9 stumpings, and 213 One Day Internationals, scoring 6,786 runs at an average of 35.34 and taking 141 catches and 32 stumpings. He holds the Zimbabwean records for the most Test career runs, the highest Test batting average, and most ODI career runs. 

His aggregate score of 341 in the first Test against South Africa in 2001 is the second highest ever by a batsman on the losing side.

Andy Flower is also the only player to score an ODI hundred on debut in a world cup match. He also has the record for the most matches (149) to score his second ODI ton after scoring a century on debut, when he did it in only in his 150th ODI.

He also holds the record for the highest ever test score posted by a wicketkeeper batsman in an innings of a test (232*). He is also the first and only wicketkeeper batsman to have a batting average of 50 in test cricket. He along with Heath Streak set the record for the highest 7th wicket partnership for Zimbabwe in ODIs (130)

Black armband

Towards the end of his career, Flower achieved international recognition when he and teammate Henry Olonga wore black armbands during the 2003 Cricket World Cup match against Namibia to protest against Robert Mugabe's policies. He and Olonga released a statement on 10 February, stating in part:

This act led to pressure from Zimbabwe's government and Flower's retirement from Zimbabwean cricket. He later played an English county cricket season for Essex and an Australian domestic season for South Australia.

Coaching career
On 7 May 2007, Flower was appointed Assistant Coach of the England team, replacing Matthew Maynard. The Zimbabwean joined up with Peter Moores and the rest of the squad for the first Test match against the West Indies at Lord's on 17 May 2007. Upon his appointment to this role with the ECB, Flower, having not played that season due to injury, ended his playing spell at Essex, bringing his playing career to a close.

On 15 April 2009, following England's Caribbean tour, for which he was installed as interim team director following the departure of Peter Moores, he was appointed full-time team director. In the Summer of 2009, during his tenure as team director, England won The Ashes, beating Australia by two Test matches to one. In May 2010, they won the 2010 ICC World Twenty20 tournament in the West Indies. In November–January 2010/2011 England won the Ashes in Australia by three Test matches to one.

Flower was appointed Officer of the Order of the British Empire (OBE) in the 2011 Birthday Honours for services to sport.

On 13 August 2011 Flower led the England cricket team to become the number one ranked team in terms of test playing countries. On 22 December 2011, he was awarded the 2011 Coach of the Year in the BBC Sports Personality of the Year awards.

He also successfully led England to Ashes victory in July–August 2013 winning the test series 3–0.

A major blip in his coaching career was the 5–0 drubbing by Australia in November–January 2013 – 2014 Ashes series. On 31 January 2014, Flower stepped down as head coach, a position he had held for five years. From March 2014, he continued his employment with the England and Wales Cricket Board as its 'Technical Director of Elite Coaching', a role that has involved mentoring English county coaches and looking at best practice in coaching and performance in other organisations. Since July 2014, this role has also encompassed him being head coach of the England Lions team, most recently leading the side on an ODI tour of the UAE in January 2016. Later in 2016 he was appointed batting coach of Peshawar Zalmi.

In 2020, he was appointed as head coach for Multan Sultans, St Lucia Zouks and as Assistant coach for Kings XI Punjab in the IPL. In 2021 he was appointed as the head coach for Lucknow Super Giants.

In 2023, he was appointed as head coach for  Gulf Giants in International League T20.

Charity
In September 2007, Flower became an Ambassador for the children's charity, Hope for Children, and has assisted in raising thousands of pounds for needy children in Zimbabwe and around the world.
In July 2011, Flower became an Ambassador for the malignant melanoma support group, Melanoma UK, having suffered from the illness himself.  He underwent surgery to remove a melanoma from his right eye in 2010. In the summer of 2012, Andy agreed to undertake another term as Ambassador to Melanoma UK.  Having run the marathon in April 2012 Andy said "It wasn’t a hard decision for me to continue in my role as Ambassador to Melanoma UK.  They do an excellent job in patient support, fundraising and raising awareness of the dangers of the sun. I wish them continued success in the coming years and who knows, another marathon might be on the cards!”

Personal life
Flower met his wife Rebecca, who is English, when playing in England. They have three children. He has spoken about the adverse impact of time away from his family due to his cricket career.

The Daily Mirror reported in 2013 that Flower had become a British citizen.

References

1968 births
Living people
South African people of British descent
Essex cricketers
Mashonaland cricketers
South Australia cricketers
Wisden Cricketers of the Year
Zimbabwean ODI captains
Zimbabwe One Day International cricketers
Zimbabwe Test cricket captains
Zimbabwe Test cricketers
Zimbabwean cricketers
Zimbabwean people of British descent
South African emigrants to Rhodesia
Marylebone Cricket Club cricketers
Coaches of the England cricket team
Commonwealth Games competitors for Zimbabwe
Cricketers at the 1998 Commonwealth Games
Cricketers at the 1992 Cricket World Cup
Cricketers at the 1996 Cricket World Cup
Cricketers at the 1999 Cricket World Cup
Cricketers at the 2003 Cricket World Cup
White Zimbabwean sportspeople
Officers of the Order of the British Empire
Cricketers from Cape Town
Cricketers who made a century on One Day International debut
Zimbabwean cricket coaches
Pakistan Super League coaches
Zimbabwean emigrants to the United Kingdom
English cricket coaches
Naturalised citizens of the United Kingdom
Wicket-keepers